Joigny is a commune in the Yonne département in Bourgogne-Franche-Comté in north-central France.

It is located on the banks of the river Yonne.

History
The current city, originally known as Joviniacum in Latin, was founded during Roman times by Flavius Jovinus prefect of the Roman militia in Gaul in AD 369.  

During medieval times, it was fortified as a stronghold at the end of the 10th century by Renard I the Old, Count of Sens, on part of the lands of the Sainte-Marie du Charnier de Sens Abbey.

Population

Some notable people 
 Marcel Aymé
 Edme Joachim Bourdois de La Motte, first physician to Napoleon's son
 Yom Tov of Joigny, Rabbi and poet
 Anne Plantagenet
 Jean de Joigny
 François de Saint-Just (1896-1989), French politician
It was also the home of Saint Madeleine Sophie Barat, who founded the Roman Catholic Society of the Sacred Heart in 1800.

Churches 
Saint John Church (11th-16th century)
Saint Andrew Church (11th-16th century)
Saint Theobald Church (16th century)

Twin towns – sister cities

Joigny is twinned with:
 Mayen, Germany (1964)
 Godalming, England, United Kingdom (1985)
 Hanover, United States (1993)
 Joigny-sur-Meuse, France (2004)
 Amelia, Italy (2005)
 Kilibo, Benin (2011)

See also
Communes of the Yonne department
Joigny coach crash

References

External links

Communes of Yonne
Champagne (province)
Populated places established in the 4th century
369 establishments